Zalman Mordecai Shapiro (12 May 1920 – 16 July 2016) was an American chemist and inventor. He received 15 patents, including a 2009 patent on a process to make commercial production of diamonds cheaper, and played a key role in the development of the reactor that powered the world's first nuclear powered submarine, the Nautilus.

Biography
Shapiro was born in Canton, Ohio, on 12 May 1920 to Abraham and Minnie (née Pinck) Shapiro. He graduated from Passaic High School in New Jersey as the valedictorian in 1938. He attended Johns Hopkins University, earning B.A., M.A., and Ph.D. degrees in 1942, 1945, and 1948, respectively.

Career
After completing his education, Shapiro moved to Pittsburgh, Pennsylvania, and began a career in engineering and chemistry. He worked for Westinghouse Electric and the Bettis Atomic Power Laboratory, where he worked on developing the fuel for the first commercial nuclear power plant, the Shippingport Atomic Power Station. He founded Nuclear Materials and Equipment Corp. (NUMEC) in Apollo, Pennsylvania in 1957 to develop improved methods of processing nuclear fuel.

Controversy

NUMEC began by doing consulting work for companies in the nuclear field, and it was the first company able to provide fuel that could be used for nuclear reactors. After the company was awarded a contract to process enriched uranium, it was told to inventory its uranium. The inventory came up short, and after a series of efforts to search and recover the material from the factory and its disposal site, the company paid $834,000 to the Atomic Energy Commission (AEC) for the missing uranium.

Shapiro was a long-time Zionist, and he had business interests and contacts among high government officials in Israel, including a contract to build nuclear-powered generators for Israel. He was suspected for many years of diverting some 269 kilograms (591 pounds) of uranium to Israel, enough to make several nuclear weapons. In September 1968, four Israeli intelligence agents visited NUMEC; among them was Rafi Eitan, who was listed as a defense ministry chemist.

The missing uranium was investigated several times over two decades. Both the AEC and the FBI examined the records and the plant; only a small portion of what was thought to be missing was located. Estimates of the missing amount have varied as well, from 200 pounds to almost 600 pounds. However, no charges were ever filed, and one report concluded that there was "no substantive evidence to indicate that a diversion occurred". Shapiro denied any wrongdoing, and said that such discrepancies are "not unusual" and that losses could be explained as normal to the complex processing.

In his 1991 book, The Samson Option, Seymour Hersh concluded that Shapiro did not divert any uranium; rather "it ended up in the air and water of the city of Apollo as well as in the ducts, tubes, and floors of the NUMEC plant." He also wrote that Shapiro's meetings with senior Israeli officials in his home were related to protecting the water supply in Israel rather than any diversion of nuclear material or information. A later investigation was conducted by the Nuclear Regulatory Commission (successor to the AEC) regarding an additional 198 pounds of uranium that was found to be missing between 1974 and 1976, after the plant had been purchased by Babcock & Wilcox and Shapiro was no longer associated with the company. That investigation found that more than 110 pounds of it could be accounted for by what was called "previously unidentified and undocumented loss mechanisms", including "contamination of workers' clothes, losses from scrubber systems, material embedded in the flooring, and residual deposits in the processing equipment." Hersh further quoted one of the main investigators, Carl Duckett, as saying "I know of nothing at all to indicate that Shapiro was guilty."

Later U.S. Department of Energy records show that NUMEC had the largest highly enriched uranium inventory loss of all U.S. commercial sites, with a  inventory loss before 1968, and  thereafter.

The US Army Corps of Engineers oversaw  a cleanup of contaminated land at the site of NUMEC's waste disposal, which was scheduled to be completed in 2015.

Personal
Shapiro married Evelyn Greenberg in 1945, and they have three children: Joshua, Ezra, and Deborah. He was formerly the president of the Pittsburgh chapter of the Zionist Organization of America. Shapiro and his wife were honored in 2008 for their contributions to the Jewish community for over 60 years. He lived in the Oakland section of Pittsburgh, where he died at the age of 96.

References

Further reading
  - System and method for diamond deposition using a liquid-solvent carbon-transfer mechanism
 
 
 
 

1920 births
2016 deaths
American chemists
20th-century American inventors
20th-century American Jews
Passaic High School alumni
People from Canton, Ohio
People from Passaic, New Jersey
Scientists from Pittsburgh
Johns Hopkins University alumni
21st-century American Jews
American Zionists
American nuclear engineers